Basque nationalism is a form of nationalism that asserts that Basques, an ethnic group indigenous to the western Pyrenees, are a nation and promotes the political unity of the Basques, today scattered between Spain and France. Since its inception in the late 19th century, Basque nationalism has included separatist movements.

Basque nationalism, spanning three different regions in two states (the Basque Autonomous Community and Navarre in Spain, and the French Basque Country in France) is "irredentist in nature" as it favours political unification of all the Basque-speaking provinces.

History

Fueros and Carlism

Basque nationalism is rooted in Carlism and the loss, by the laws of 1839 and 1876, of the Ancien Régime relationship between the Spanish Basque provinces and the crown of Spain. During this period, the reactionary and the liberal brand of the pro-fueros movement pleaded for the maintenance of the fueros system and territorial autonomy against the centralizing pressures from liberal or conservative governments in Madrid. The Spanish government suppressed the fueros after the Third Carlist War.

The fueros were the native decision making and justice system issued from consuetudinary law prevailing in the Basque territories and Pyrenees. They are first recorded in the Kingdom of Navarre, confirming its charter system also across the western Basque territories during the High Middle Ages. In the wake of Castile's conquest of Gipuzkoa, Álava and Durango (1200), the fueros were partially ratified by the kings of Castile and acted as part of the Basque legal system dealing with matters regarding the political ties of the Basque districts with the crown. The Fueros guaranteed the Basques a separate position in Spain with their own tax and political status. While its corpus is extensive, prerogatives contained in them set out for one that Basques were not subject to direct levee to the Castilian army, although many volunteered.

Sabino Arana
The native Basque institutions and laws were abolished in 1876 after the Third Carlist War (called the Second in the Basque context), and replaced by the Basque Economic Agreements. The levelling process with other Spanish regions disquieted the Basques. According to Sabino Arana's views, the Biscayan (and Basque) personality was being diluted in the idea of an exclusive Spanish nation fostered by centralist authorities in Madrid. Arana was inspired by his brother Luis, a co-designer of the Basque flag ikurriña (1895), and a major nationalist figure after Sabino's death (1903).

Arana felt that not only the Basque personality was endangered but also its former religious institutions, like Church or the Society of Jesus, which still often spoke in Basque to its parishioners, unlike school or administration. Sabino characterized Catholicism as a sort of shelter for Basque personality. This became a point of contention with other personalities holding like views and clustering around Arana's manifesto Bizkaya por su independencia (1892). Later industrialist and prominent Basque nationalist Ramon de la Sota dismissed Sabino's positions of Catholicism as inherent to the national issue.

In 1893, the Gamazada popular uprising erupted in Navarre against the breach by the Spanish government of several foundations of the treaties ending the Carlist Wars (1841, 1876). Arana eagerly supported the Navarrese outbreak by travelling to the territory and participating. The widespread protest in Navarre sparked solidarity in Biscay. In 1893, after a support meeting held in Gernika attended by pro-fueros personalities, a group led by Arana overtly blamed Spain for the current state of matters, going on to set a Spanish flag ablaze. This rebellion, called the Sanrocada, is held as the beginning of political Basque nationalism.

In 1895, the Basque Nationalist Party was founded around Arana (PNV in its Spanish acronym, EAJ in Basque). His nationalism shifted from a focus on Biscay to the rest of Basque territories. The program of Arana was specified as follows:

By the end of the 19th century, Arana differed clearly from the Carlists, his initial background. He accompanied his views with an ideology centred on the purity of the Basque race and its alleged moral supremacy over other Spaniards (a derivation of the system of limpieza de sangre of Modern-Age Spain), and deep opposition to the mass-immigration of other Spaniards to the Basque Country. The immigration had started after the boom of manufacturing related to the ore exportation to England and privatization of communal lands and exploitations (mines) as the fueros were lost.

Arana died in 1903 months after releasing a controversial manifesto renouncing his former tenets while in prison for supporting Cuban independence, and just months after the Basque leader congratulated US president Theodore Roosevelt for its support to Cuba. The nature of that document is still subject to discussion. Luis Arana took the reins of the Basque Nationalist Party.

In the early 20th century, Basque nationalism, developed from a nucleus of enthusiasts (non-native Basque speakers themselves) in Bilbao to incorporate the agrarian Carlists in Biscay, and Gipuzkoa. The seeds of Seminal Basque nationalism bloomed also in Navarre and Álava early on (Aranzadi, Irujo, Agirre, etc.) on the heat of the Gamazada (1893-1894).

Modern history

The movement survived without major problems the dictatorship of Miguel Primo de Rivera under the guise of cultural and athletic associations. The Basque Nationalist Party split in the early 20s, and Comunión Nacionalista Vasca was created. Basque nationalists allied with Carlism in support of the Catholic Church as a barrier against leftist anti-clericalism in most of the Basque provinces, although alliances started to change with the coming of the Second Spanish Republic (1931).

By the start of the Second Spanish Republic, a small cluster of secularist Basque nationalists had sown the seeds of the EAE-ANV, while PNV clung to its traditionalist Catholicism. However, failure by a Carlist faction to back up the Basque statute in 1932 and the radicalization of their anti-Republican discourse, opened the Basque nationalists to new alliances with Republican and leftist parties, gradually shifting to a Christian-Democrat position willing to some sort of compromise with the left.

In 1936, the main part of the Christian-Democrat PNV sided with the Second Spanish Republic in the Spanish Civil War. The promise of autonomy was valued over the ideological differences, especially on the religious matter, and PNV decided to support the legal republican government. After stopping the far-right military rebels in Intxorta (Biscay-Gipuzkoa border), autonomy was achieved in October 1936. A republican autonomous Basque government was established, with José Antonio Agirre (PNV) as Lehendakari (president) and ministers from the PNV and other republican parties (mainly leftist Spanish parties).

However, in 1937, roughly halfway through the war, Basque troops, then under control of the Autonomous Basque Government surrendered in an action brokered by the Basque church and the Vatican in Santoña to the Italian allies of General Franco on condition that the Basque heavy industry and economy was left untouched.

For many leftists in Spain, the surrender of Basque troops in Santoña (Santander) is known as the Treason of Santoña. Many of the nationalist Basque soldiers were pardoned if they joined the Francoist army in the rest of the Northern front. Basque nationalists submitted, went underground, or were sent to prison, and the movement's political leaders fled. Small groups escaped to the Americas, France and Benelux, of which only a minority returned after the restoration of democracy in Spain in the late seventies, or before.

During World War II, the exiled PNV government attempted to join the Allies and settled itself in New York to gain American recognition and support, but soon after the war finished, Franco became an American ally in the context of the Cold War, depriving the PNV of any chance of power in the Basque Country.

Basque nationalist organizations

Political parties and coalitions

Amaiur, political coalition formed for the 2011 Spanish general election.
Aralar, leftist political party
Batasuna, leftist political party, illegal in Spain on grounds of links with the armed organization ETA. It was known previously as Herri Batasuna and Euskal Herritarrok.
Batzarre, a political party in Navarre
Comunión Nacionalista Vasca, former political party
EH Bildu, political coalition formed in 2011
Euskadiko Ezkerra, former leftist political party
Euskal Ezkerra, a splinter of Euskadiko Ezkerra
Eusko Abertzale Ekintza, leftist political party
Eusko Alkartasuna, Social-Democratic political party
Nafarroa Bai, Navarrese political party (coalition between some Basque nationalist political parties)
Basque Nationalist Party, Christian-Democrat political party
Sortu, political party
Zutik, leftist party

Organizations
Askatasuna, support for ETA prisoners
Basque Workers' Solidarity, trade union
Enbata
ETA, separatist armed organization operating mainly in the Spanish Basque Country
Etxerat, relatives' and friends' support group of individuals subjected to state repression
ESAIT, support for the Basque National teams in different sports
Gestoras pro-Amnistía, support for ETA prisoners
Herria 2000 Eliza, Catholic movement
Ikasle Abertzaleak, Group of Basque nationalist students
Iparretarrak, violently clandestine organization operating in the French part of the Basque Country
Irrintzi, armed organization of the French Basque Country
Jagi-Jagi, former magazine
LAB, leftist trade union
Senideak, relatives of Basque activists (mostly ETA members) in prison
Segi, Batasuna's youth group
Udalbiltza, assembly of city councillors
Gazte Abertzaleak, the youth group of the Spanish Basque political party Eusko Alkartasuna, left of the PNV but not aligned with ETA or Batasuna

See also 

 Athletic Bilbao
 Basque Republic
 Carlism
 Eusko Abendaren Ereserkia
 José Antonio Aguirre
 Iñaki Kijera Zelarain
 Ikurriña
 Navarrese nationalism
 Politics of France
 Politics of Spain
 Sabino Arana

References

Bibliography

External links
Barbara Loyer, "Basque nationalism undermined by ETA,"  Le Monde Diplomatique (1998)